The 1981 All-Ireland Senior Ladies' Football Championship Final was the eighth All-Ireland Final and the deciding match of the 1981 All-Ireland Senior Ladies' Football Championship, an inter-county ladies' Gaelic football tournament for the top teams in Ireland.

Offaly were hot favourites but trailed 3–0 to 0–6 at half-time. Cavan ran out of steam in the second half and Offaly won by two.

References

!
All-Ireland Senior Ladies' Football Championship Finals
Cavan county ladies' football team matches
Offaly county ladies' football team matches
All-Ireland